Kola Gar Sara may refer to:
 Kola Gar Sara, Babol
 Kola Gar Sara, Fereydunkenar